Feng Wenjuan (born 20 August 1989) is a Chinese actress best known for her role in a number of films, including The Last Tycoon (2012), Operation Mekong (2016), and Project Gutenberg (2017).

Early life and education 
Feng was born in Baoding, Hebei, on 20 August 1989, and graduated from the Central Academy of Drama in 2012.

Acting career 
In 2012, Feng made her film debut in The Last Tycoon, for which she received Best New Performer nomination at the 32nd Hong Kong Film Awards.

Feng made her television debut in The Lure of Cloud (2013), playing Yu Wen.

Feng starred with Zhu Zhu, Shi Yufei, and Yang Feiyang, in Raymond Yip's suspense thriller film Tales of Mystery. 

In 2015, she had key supporting role in Flying Swords of Dragon Gate, a wuxia television series based on Tsui Hark's film of the same name.

In 2016, for her role as Guo Bing in Operation Mekong, Feng was nominated for Best Supporting Actress at the 34th Hundred Flowers Awards. In the following year, Feng earned her second Best Supporting Actress nomination at the 35th Hundred Flowers Awards for her performance in Project Gutenberg, and won Best Supporting Actress at the 1st Hainan Island International Film Festival. 

Feng was cast as Eva in Undercover Punch and Gun, opposite Philip Ng, Vanness Wu and Andy On. That same year, she had a minor role in The Captain, which starred Zhang Hanyu, Yuan Quan, and Zhang Tian'ai.

In 2021, Feng made a guest appearance on Chiu Keng Guan's drama film On Your Mark. Feng was cast in the lead role of Xin Wei in the disaster film Chinese Doctors, directed by Andrew Lau.

Filmography

Film

Television

Film and TV Awards

References 

1989 births
Living people
People from Baoding
Central Academy of Drama alumni
Chinese film actresses
Chinese television actresses
21st-century Chinese actresses
Actresses from Hebei